Ace of Angels is the first studio album and major Japanese release by South Korean girl group AOA, It was released on October 14, 2015 through Universal Music Japan.

To promote the album, AOA embarked on their first Japan concert tour, Angels World 2015 ~Oh Boy Academy~, in December 2015.

Background and release

After releasing three singles in the Japanese market, including "Miniskirt," "Like a Cat," and "Heart Attack," AOA announced that they will release their debut Japanese studio album titled Ace of Angels on October 14, 2015, including selective eight previously released songs and three new original songs, "Oh Boy," "Lemon Slush," and "Stay with Me."

A music video and a dance version for the track "Oh Boy" were released along with the formal release of the album on October 14, 2015.

Editions

Ace of Angels was released in ten different physical versions: A Limited CD+DVD Edition (Type A), a Limited CD+Desk Calendar Edition (Type B), seven Limited Picture Label Member CD Editions, and a Regular CD Edition.
 Limited CD+DVD edition comes with a bonus DVD featuring "Oh Boy"'s original and dance versions of the music video, plus "Miniskirt", "Like a Cat", and "Heart Attack" Japanese music videos.
 Limited CD+Desk Calendar edition comes with a bonus desk calendar.
 Limited picture label member CD editions come in a standard jewel case without album cover and lyrics booklet. There are a total of seven editions in matching with seven members.
 Regular CD edition comes in a standard jewel case with a lyrics-only booklet.

Singles

"Miniskirt" is AOA's debut single in Japanese. The single was the first ever Japanese-language track released by AOA on October 1, 2014 in Japan. The short version of music video "Miniskirt" was released on September 8, 2014. The full music video for "Miniskirt" was released on September 10, 2014. The physical single also included the Japanese version of "Short Hair" and the original version of the Korean track "Get Out".

AOA released their second Japanese single titled "Like a Cat" on February 25, 2015. The short version of music video was released on February 8, 2015. A dance version was officially released on February 25, 2015 on AOA's Vevo channel. The physical single included the Japanese versions of "Elvis" and "Just the Two of Us", which were previously available on AOA's first single album Angels' Story (2012) and their second EP, Like a Cat (2014), respectively.

The third Japanese single, "Heart Attack," was physically released on July 29, 2015. The short version of music video was released on July 19, 2015. The full music video was released on the next day, July 20, 2015. A dance version was available on July 4, 2015 on AOA's Vevo channel. The physical single included the Japanese versions of "Confused" and "Joa Yo!", which were previously available on the fourth Korean single album Red Motion (2013) and the first EP Short Hair (2014), respectively.

The first track, "Oh Boy," was released digitally as the only promotional single for the album on October 1, 2015, and two versions of its music videos were included in the DVD of the album.

Track listing

Charts

Release history

References

2015 debut albums
AOA (group) albums
Universal Music Japan albums
Japanese-language albums
FNC Entertainment albums